Lymantria concolor is a moth of the family Erebidae first described by Francis Walker in 1855. It is found in Sikkim, the Himalayas,  Taiwan and Thailand.

The wingspan is 40–54 mm.

The larvae defoliate fruit trees.

References

Moths described in 1855
Lymantria